Lance Smith (born January 1, 1963) is a former American football guard who played 12 seasons in the National Football League (NFL) for the St. Louis/Phoenix Cardinals and the New York Giants.  He played college football at Louisiana State University and was drafted in the third round of the 1985 NFL draft.

References

 

1963 births
Living people
American football offensive guards
LSU Tigers football players
St. Louis Cardinals (football) players
Phoenix Cardinals players
New York Giants players
Players of American football from New York City